Expressway S8 or express road S8, officially named The Route of the Heroes of the Battle of Warsaw 1920 (pl. droga ekspresowa S8, Trasa Bohaterów Bitwy Warszawskiej 1920 r.) is a major road in Poland which connects Wrocław  via Łódź and Warsaw to Białystok. Its fragment forming the bypass of Wrocław (22.7 km) is constructed in motorway standard and marked as A8 instead.

Construction of its last fragment finished in October 2019. The construction was part of the European Union's plan to fund express roads in Poland.

In September 2019, it was announced that an extension of S8 from Wrocław to Kłodzko was added to the plans and will be constructed in the future.

Originally, the road was to continue to the border with Lithuania, but in 2009 the plans were changed and instead S61 now branches off S8 and goes to the border. The S8 section from Warsaw to S61 serves as part of Via Baltica.

S8 in Warsaw 

S8 runs through Warsaw and is part of its network of bypass roads. Various fragments were completed between 2010 and 2015. It was constructed mostly as an upgrade of the city's existing inner highways. As such, it might be considered not to fully meet the definition of a bypass due to it serving both the transit and local district traffic at the same time. In the peak hours, large traffic jams form on this section every day.

During rush hours (7-10 and 16-20), the road is closed for truck drivers, who have to bypass the city area through roads 50 and 62 (north-west of Warsaw) or through roads S2 and 50 (south-east of Warsaw).

See also 
European route E67

References

External links

 Official page of S8 construction:  Wrocław – Syców
 Official page of S8 construction: Piotrków Trybunalski – Rawa Mazowiecka
 Official page of S8 construction: Konotopa – Powązkowska
 Official page of S8 construction: Powązkowska – Modlińska 
 Official page of S8 construction: Modlińska – Marki in Warsaw
 Official page of S8 construction: Zambrów and Wiśniew bypass
 Official page of S8 construction: Jeżewo – Białystok

Expressways in Poland
Proposed roads in Poland